Willie M. "Fourteen" Wynn (August 25, 1917 – July 14, 1992) was an American baseball catcher in the Negro leagues. He played with the Newark Eagles in 1944 and 1945 and in 1947 and 1948, and the Philadelphia Stars in 1946 and 1947.

References

External links
 and Seamheads

1917 births
1992 deaths
Baseball players from North Carolina
Baseball catchers
Philadelphia Stars players
Newark Eagles players
People from Windsor, North Carolina
20th-century African-American sportspeople